Around 45 privately owned television channels were permitted by the Government of Bangladesh as of 2019, of which thirty four are currently on air. Five television channels, namely CSB News, Channel 1, Diganta Television, Islamic TV, and Channel 16, have been taken off air. Bangladesh has four state-owned television stations, of which only three broadcast on terrestrial television, which are BTV Dhaka, BTV Chittagong, and Sangsad Television. In total, there are 49 television channels in Bangladesh, with 38 currently on-air.

State-owned 
As of today, Bangladesh has four state-owned television channels. Among them, Bangladesh Television is the oldest, founded in 1964.

Privately owned

Mixed Entertainment

News

Infotainment

Business-related

Music

Children's

Sports

Defunct

Upcoming channels 
 Amar Gaan
 Amar TV
 CNN Bangla TV
 Cambrian TV
 Channel 21
 Channel 52
 Citizen TV
 Green TV
 Khela TV
 Prime TV
 TV Today
 Utshab TV

See also

Television in Bangladesh
List of radio stations in Bangladesh
Media of Bangladesh
Telecommunications in Bangladesh

References

External links
 Ministry of Information
 Bangladesh Telecommunication Regulatory Commission

Bangladesh
Bangladesh communications-related lists
Bengali television-related lists